Lufeng, alternately romanized as Lukfung, is a county-level city in the southeast of Guangdong province, administered as a part of the prefecture-level city of Shanwei. It lies on the mainland on coast of the South China Sea east of Hong Kong.

History 
Together with neighboring Haifeng and the now separated Luhe county now carved out from Lufeng, it formed the short-lived Hailufeng Soviet in 1927. It was later promoted to county-level city status.

The area rose to prominence in the early 21st century as a scene of unrest. Jieshi saw serious inter-village violence over road use in October 2009 and March 2010 and, in September 2011, a series of protests or riots occurred in Wukan Village over allegations of Communist Party members unfairly selling farmers' land for development. Fresh protests broke out in December, when one of the village leaders died in the police custody. The police blocked the roads leading to the village.

Administration

As of 2005 year's end, the city comprises three urban subdistricts and 17 towns. These are organised into 47 neighbourhood committees and 280 village committees.

The city's executive, legislature and judiciary are located in the Donghai Subdistrict, together with the CPC subbranch and PSB suboffice. Wukan Village, site of the Wukan protests, is also located in the Donghai subdistrict.

Urban subdistricts
 Donghai
 Chengdong
 Hexi

Towns
Jieshi (碣石)
Qiaochong
Bomei
Jiazi (Kapchi; Chiatzu)
Jiadong
Jiaxi
Hudong
Beiyang
Nantang
Bawan
Tanxi
Da'an
Jinxiang
Neihu
Xinan
Shangying
Hedong

Demography
Lufeng has a population of 1.7 million, the most of them are Han Chinese. More specifically, a considerable percentage of the population belong to the Minnan sub group; the rest are Teochews, Hakka and Ming Dynasty Jianghuai military speakers. Therefore, dialects of both Min Nan, Teochew and Hakka are spoken, in addition to Mandarin, which is used in official and public life. The Hailufeng dialect, however, only refers to the Hokkien variant.

Climate

Transportation
Lufeng railway station on the Xiamen–Shenzhen railway serves the city, though it is located some distance outside the city.

Lufeng East and Lufeng South, both on the Shantou–Shanwei high-speed railway, will serve the city in the future.

Notable people 
 Wen Yuan-ning, also known as Oon Guan-neng, Chinese professor, writer, and diplomat.
 Wong Yuk-man, Hong Kong politician
 Charles Heung, actor-turned-film producer and presenter
 Ada Zhuang, C-pop artist

See also
 Boshe, a village in Jiaxi
 Wukan protests

Notes

References

Citations

Bibliography
 , reprinted 2000.

 
County-level cities in Guangdong
Shanwei